Volume 3 is a studio album by the Australian rock band The Easybeats, released on 3 November 1966. It was the third and final album from the group recorded in Australia before relocating to England.

Production
Like their previous release, It's 2 Easy, this album was recorded during one of their tours of Melbourne at Armstrong Studios and at EMI Studios in Sydney.  Ted Albert returned as producer with Parlophone Australia's A&R manager, Tony Geary.

Releases
It was released by Albert Productions on the Parlophone label in Australia on 3 November 1966, after the band had departed for the UK. The album was only released in mono; no stereo mix was made.  It was reissued by Albert Productions (this time on their own label) in the 1980s on compact disc.  Reissue label Repertoire Records later released the album in 1992 with eleven bonus tracks.  These included b-sides, demos, album outtakes, alternate mixes from the Good Friday album and the group's earliest recordings from the 2UW Theatre.

Reception
Volume 3 would peak at #7 on the Kent Music Report charts and would end being the 21st best selling Australian album of 1966. The lead single "Sorry" peaked at #1 on the Australian Go-Set's National Top 40 in mid November 1966. It remained at #1 on the Australian Charts for 2 weeks in November 1966.

Track listing

Side A

Side B

Personnel

The Easybeats
Stevie Wright - vocals
Harry Vanda - vocals, lead guitar, 12-string guitar
George Young - vocals, rhythm guitar
Dick Diamonde - bass guitar
Snowy Fleet - vocals, drums
Production Team
Ted Albert - producer
Tony Geary - co-producer

Sales charts and certification

Australian Charts

References

External links
 [ allmusic - Volume 3 (Expanded edition)]
 MILESAGO - The Easybeats
Volume 3 - The Music Goes 'Round My Head: An unofficial site dedicated to the recorded music of The Easybeats

The Easybeats albums
1966 albums
Albert Productions albums